Abujh Bou (English: The Immature Wife) is a 2010 Bangladeshi film directed by Arthik Sazib and Nargis Akhtar and stars Ferdous Ahmed and Priyanka in her debut role. It earned three awards at 35th Bangladesh National Film Awards.

Synopsis 
It is a female centric movie. Mrinmoyee, a desperate tomboy girl who taunts all in-laws after her marriage, later turns realistic.

Cast 
 Bobita
 Priyanka (debut) - Mrinmoyee
 Ferdous Ahmed - Apurba Roy
 Nipun - Kalyani

Release
The film had its World TV premier on 10 September 2010. The same day it was released.

Soundtrack

Awards 
35th Bangladesh National Film Awards
 Best Screenplay - Nargis Akhtar
 Best Music Director - Sujeo Shyam
 Best Editor - Mujibur Rahman Dulu

See also 
 Meghla Akash
 Megher Koley Rod

References

External links 
 

2010 films
Bengali-language Bangladeshi films
Films directed by Nargis Akhter
Films scored by Shujeo Shyam
2010s Bengali-language films
Impress Telefilm films